is a Japanese professional footballer who plays as a centre back for club FC Tokyo.

International career
In July 2007, Morishige was elected Japan U20 national team for 2007 FIFA U-20 World Cup. At this tournament, he played three matches as defensive midfielder. In August 2008, he was elected Japan U23 national team for 2008 Summer Olympics. At this tournament, he played full time in all three matches as defender.

Career statistics

Club

International

Scores and results list Japan's goal tally first, score column indicates score after each Morishige goal.

Honours
Oita Trinita
J.League Cup: 2008

FC Tokyo
Suruga Bank Championship: 2010
J2 League: 2011
Emperor's Cup: 2011
J.League Cup: 2020

Japan
EAFF East Asian Cup: 2013, 2015

Individual
J. League Best Eleven: 2013, 2014, 2015, 2016, 2019

References

External links

 
 
 
 Profile at FC Tokyo
 
 Personal Twitter account

1987 births
Living people
Association football people from Hiroshima Prefecture
Japanese footballers
Association football central defenders
Japan international footballers
Japan youth international footballers
J1 League players
J2 League players
Oita Trinita players
FC Tokyo players
Olympic footballers of Japan
Footballers at the 2008 Summer Olympics
2014 FIFA World Cup players
2015 AFC Asian Cup players